Danny Setiawan (born 28 August 1945) is an Indonesian former politician and civil servant who served as the governor of West Java between 2003 and 2008. In 2008, he was arrested and later sentenced to four years in prison for a corruption case, and he was released in 2011.

Early life
Setiawan was born in Purwakarta on 28 August 1945. As his father was a soldier, Setiawan frequently moved in his childhood following his father's postings, and he completed elementary school in Cirebon, middle school in Bogor, and high school in Purwakarta. He then enrolled at the Interior Government Academy (APDN) in Bandung, graduating in 1968.

Career
After his graduation, he was recruited to become an adjutant to the regent in Lebak Regency. After a year, he was reassigned to the local government in Manokwari before returning to Lebak, where he worked for over 10 years until his move into the provincial government in Bandung by 1984. He headed a variety of provincial departments, until he was appointed as the provincial secretary in 1998. He held this post until 2003.

Governor
In May 2003, with gubernatorial elections incoming, Setiawan secured the support of Golkar to run. Against him was PDI-P-backed retired major general , formerly commander of West Java-based Kodam Siliwangi. Despite Tarmadi's military background, however, the 10 of 100 members of the West Java Regional People's Representative Council hailing from the military refused to support him. With implicit military backing, Setiawan was eventually elected as governor of West Java after winning 49 of 88 available votes, the military representatives abstaining in the vote. His term began on 13 June 2003. He ran for reelection in the direct elections of 2008, but placed last of three candidates, behind winner Ahmad Heryawan and runner-up Agum Gumelar.

Arrest and imprisonment
On 21 July 2008, the Corruption Eradication Commission named Setiawan as a suspect for suspected corruption in the procurement of firetrucks during his tenure. After investigation, he was taken into custody on 10 November 2008. He was sentenced to four years' imprisonment on 30 June 2009, and was additionally fined Rp 100 million. He was released on parole on 18 February 2011, although his full sentence was supposed to expire on 3 November 2012.

References

1945 births
Living people
Governors of West Java
People from Purwakarta Regency
Indonesian civil servants
Indonesian politicians convicted of corruption